Meadowvale is a rural locality in the Bundaberg Region, Queensland, Australia. In the  Meadowvale had a population of 469 people.

History 
Meadowvale State School opened on 10 April 1934 and closed on 18 February 1945.

In the  Meadowvale had a population of 469 people.

References 

Bundaberg Region
Localities in Queensland